Merritt is a masculine and feminine given name. It is of British origin and is traditionally a male name. Notable people with the name include:

 Merritt Brunies (1895–1973), American jazz trombonist and cornetist
 Merritt Bucholz (born 1966), American architect
 Merritt Butrick (1959–1989), American actor
 Merritt L. Campbell (1864–1915), American politician
 Merritt Clark (1803–1898), businessman and politician
 Merritt Cooke Jr. (1884–1967), American football player
 Merritt B. Curtis (1892–1966), United States Marine Corps officer
 Merritt A. Edson (1897–1955), United States Marine Corps general
 Merritt Lyndon Fernald (1873–1950), American botanist
 Merritt Gant (born 1971), guitarist
 Merritt B. Gerstad (1900–1974), American cinematographer
 Merritt Giffin (1887–1911), American athlete
 Merritt Green (1930–2016), American football player
 Merritt Eldred Hoag (1909–1994), lieutenant colonel in the U.S. Army
 Merritt Hotchkiss (1814–1865), Canadian politician
 Merritt Yerkes Hughes (1893–1971), academic
 Merritt David Janes, American stage actor and singer
 merritt k, Canadian video game designer
 Merritt Kellogg (1832–1922), missionary
 Merritt Lamb (1892–1918), scout
 Merritt Mathias (born 1990), American soccer forward
 Merritt Mauzey (1897–1973), American lithographer, author and illustrator
 Merritt C. Mechem (1870–1946), jurist and politician
 Merritt Patterson (born 1990), Canadian actress
 Merritt Paulson, American businessman
 Merritt Putman (1900–1995), Canadian cross-country skier
 Merritt Ranew (1938–2011), American baseballer
 Merritt J. Reid (1855–1932), American architect
 Merritt Clarke Ring (1850–1915), American lawyer
 Merritt Ruhlen (born 1944), American linguist
 Merritt Roe Smith (born 1940), American historian
 Merritt Starkweather (1891–1972), architect
 Merritt Wever (born 1980), American actress
 Merritt F. White (1865–1934), American politician
 Merritt Lis Dostmann (2006-), German

See also
 Merrett, surname
 Merritte W. Ireland (1867–1952), U.S. Army Surgeon General